Rhianna Mae Southby (born 16 October 2000) is an English cricketer who currently plays for Surrey and Southern Vipers. She plays as a wicket-keeper and right-handed batter. She previously played for Surrey Stars, South East Stars and Oval Invincibles.

Domestic career
Southby made her county debut in 2016, for Surrey against Warwickshire, in which she took one catch and made one stumping. The same season, she played four matches in the Twenty20 Cup, in which Surrey won promotion to Division 1. Two seasons later, Southby was ever-present as Surrey won promotion to Division 1 of the County Championship. In 2021, Southby scored 78 runs in the Twenty20 Cup, with a high score of 32. She scored 96 runs in the 2022 Women's Twenty20 Cup, including her maiden Twenty20 half-century, scoring 50 against Hampshire.

Southby was also part of the Surrey Stars squad in the Women's Cricket Super League in 2018 and 2019. She played three matches across the two seasons, and made two stumpings.

In 2020, Southby played for South East Stars in the Rachael Heyhoe Flint Trophy. She appeared in all six matches, scoring 32 runs, taking 1 catch and making 3 stumpings. In 2021, she played three matches in the Rachael Heyhoe Flint Trophy, as well as being part of the Oval Invincibles winning squad in The Hundred. In 2022, she played five matches for South East Stars, all in the Rachael Heyhoe Flint Trophy, scoring 85 runs including her maiden List A half-century, scoring 54 against Western Storm. At the end of the 2022 season, it was announced that Southby had joined Southern Vipers.

References

External links

2000 births
Living people
Place of birth missing (living people)
Surrey women cricketers
Surrey Stars cricketers
South East Stars cricketers